The European Competition Law Review (ECLR) is a monthly journal published by Sweet & Maxwell and dedicated to international competition law. The publication is in English.

See also
 List of law journals

References

External links
 

Monthly magazines published in the United Kingdom
British law journals
International law journals
European Union law
European Union competition law
Law journals
Professional and trade magazines
Works about competition law